The IWGP U-30 Openweight Championship was a professional wrestling openweight championship in New Japan Pro-Wrestling for younger wrestlers who were under the age of 30. It was proposed as part of a tournament called the G2 U-30 Climax by Hiroshi Tanahashi, who ended up winning the tournament in April 2003. The U-30 Openweight Championship became officially recognized as an IWGP title in November 2004.

Only two champions between three reigns were ever crowned over its three year existence, the inaugural and two time champion Hiroshi Tanahashi, and Shinsuke Nakamura.

As his 30th birthday began to approach (which would then make him ineligible to be the champion), Tanahashi vacated the title on June 7, 2006, to focus on the IWGP Heavyweight Championship, and soon afterwards the U-30 Openweight Championship was de-emphasized and soon deactivated.

Title history

Combined reigns

See also
NEVER Openweight Championship

References

External links
New Japan Pro-Wrestling: IWGP U-30 Open Weight Championship
Wrestling-Titles.com: IWGP U-30 Open-weight Title
IWGP U-30 Openweight Championship

New Japan Pro-Wrestling championships
Openweight wrestling championships